The Hong Kong Sevens is contested annually as part of the IRB Sevens World Series for international rugby sevens (seven-a-side version of rugby union). The 2008 competition, which took place between March 28 and March 30 in Hong Kong, was the fifth Cup trophy in the 2007-08 IRB Sevens World Series and was won by New Zealand. The winners extended their all-time IRB Sevens record for consecutive match wins to 42 while claiming their fifth Cup win of the season and seventh in a row overall.

Pool stages

Pool A
{| class="wikitable" style="text-align: center;"
|-
!width="200"|Team
!width="40"|Pld
!width="40"|W
!width="40"|D
!width="40"|L
!width="40"|PF
!width="40"|PA
!width="40"|+/-
!width="40"|Pts
|- 
|align=left| 
|3||3||0||0||135||12||+123||9
|-
|align=left| 
|3||2||0||1||71||85||-14||7
|-
|align=left| 
|3||1||0||2||87||69||+18||5
|-
|align=left| 
|3||0||0||3||27||154||-127||3
|}

Pool B
{| class="wikitable" style="text-align: center;"
|-
!width="200"|Team
!width="40"|Pld
!width="40"|W
!width="40"|D
!width="40"|L
!width="40"|PF
!width="40"|PA
!width="40"|+/-
!width="40"|Pts
|-
|align=left| 
|3||3||0||0||78||24||+54||9
|-
|align=left| 
|3||2||0||1||76||26||+50||7
|-
|align=left| 
|3||1||0||2||77||60||+17||5
|-
|align=left| 
|3||0||0||3||14||135||-121||3
|}

Pool C
{| class="wikitable" style="text-align: center;"
|-
!width="200"|Team
!width="40"|Pld
!width="40"|W
!width="40"|D
!width="40"|L
!width="40"|PF
!width="40"|PA
!width="40"|+/-
!width="40"|Pts
|-
|align=left| 
|3||3||0||0||107||21||+86||9
|-
|align=left| 
|3||2||0||1||66||24||+42||7
|-
|align=left| 
|3||1||0||2||24||93||-69||5
|-
|align=left| 
|3||0||0||3||24||83||-59||3
|}

Pool D
{| class="wikitable" style="text-align: center;"
|-
!width="200"|Team
!width="40"|Pld
!width="40"|W
!width="40"|D
!width="40"|L
!width="40"|PF
!width="40"|PA
!width="40"|+/-
!width="40"|Pts
|-
|align=left| 
|3||3||0||0||99||21||+78||9
|- 
|align=left| 
|3||2||0||1||68||20||+48||7
|-
|align=left| 
|3||1||0||2||35||81||-46||5
|-
|align=left| 
|3||0||0||3||17||97||-80||3
|}

Pool E
{| class="wikitable" style="text-align: center;"
|-
!width="200"|Team
!width="40"|Pld
!width="40"|W
!width="40"|D
!width="40"|L
!width="40"|PF
!width="40"|PA
!width="40"|+/-
!width="40"|Pts
|-
|align=left| 
|3||3||0||0||85||14||+71||9
|- 
|align=left| 
|3||1||0||2||57||55||+2||5
|-
|align=left| 
|3||1||0||2||45||48||-3||5
|-
|align=left| 
|3||1||0||2||29||99||-70||5
|}

Pool F
{| class="wikitable" style="text-align: center;"
|-
!width="200"|Team
!width="40"|Pld
!width="40"|W
!width="40"|D
!width="40"|L
!width="40"|PF
!width="40"|PA
!width="40"|+/-
!width="40"|Pts
|-
|align=left| 
|3||3||0||0||58||39||+19||9
|- 
|align=left| 
|3||1||1||1||54||45||+9||6
|-
|align=left| 
|3||1||0||2||78||43||+35||5
|-
|align=left| 
|3||0||1||2||38||101||-63||4
|}

Knockout

Bowl

Plate

Cup

Sponsors

The tournament's co-title sponsors were Cathay Pacific and Credit Suisse.

Notes and references

External links
Hong Kong Sevens Profile on UR7s.com
 Hong Kong Sevens on irb.com
 IRB Sevens World Series

2008
rugby union
2007–08 IRB Sevens World Series
2008 in Asian rugby union
March 2008 sports events in Asia